Miller Township is one of thirty townships in Knox County, Nebraska, United States. The population was 154 at the 2020 census. A 2021 estimate placed the township's population at 154.

The Village of Winnetoon lies within the Township.

See also
County government in Nebraska

References

External links
City-Data.com

Townships in Knox County, Nebraska
Townships in Nebraska